Humphrey is a given name and a surname.

Humphrey may also refer to:

Animals
 Humphrey (cat) (1988–2006), cat employed at 10 Downing Street, the British Prime Minister's residence
 Humphrey (chimpanzee), featured in several books and documentaries
 Humphrey the Whale, a humpback whale that deviated from its migration path and swam into San Francisco Bay and up the Sacramento River

Places in the United States
 Humphrey, Arkansas, a city
 Humphrey, Idaho, an unincorporated community
 Humphrey, Nebraska, a city
 Humphrey, New York, a town
 Humphrey, West Virginia, an unincorporated community
 Humphrey Township, Platte County, Nebraska

Other uses
 Humphrey Center, administration building at Grand View University in Des Moines, Iowa, United States
 Humphrey Coliseum, a multi-purpose arena in Starkville, Mississippi, United States
 Humphrey Go-Bart, a shuttle bus service that connected UC Berkeley with Berkeley BART station, United States
 Humphrey School of Public Affairs, University of Minnesota, Minneapolis, Minnesota, United States

See also
 Humphreys (disambiguation)